Dent County Courthouse is a historic courthouse located in Salem, Dent County, Missouri.  It was built in 1870, with an addition constructed in 1897. It is a 2 1/2-story, Second Empire-style brick building on a hewn limestone foundation, with a 3 1/2-story central tower.  It features high and narrow windows, lofty cornice, mansard roof and dormers and cast iron cresting.

It was listed on the National Register of Historic Places in 1972.

References

County courthouses in Missouri
Courthouses on the National Register of Historic Places in Missouri
Second Empire architecture in Missouri
Government buildings completed in 1870
Buildings and structures in Dent County, Missouri
National Register of Historic Places in Dent County, Missouri